Josef Karlík (19 March 1928, in Kroměříž – 30 October 2009, in Brno) was a Czech actor. He starred in the film Poslední propadne peklu under director Ludvík Ráža in 1982.

Selected filmography
 Jak dostat tatínka do polepšovny (1978)
 Poslední propadne peklu (1982)

References

External links

1928 births
2009 deaths
Czech male film actors
Czech male television actors
People from Kroměříž
Janáček Academy of Music and Performing Arts alumni
Czech male voice actors
Recipients of the Thalia Award